Project X is the debut studio album by American rapper Ken Carson, released through Opium and Foundation Media on July 23, 2021. The album serves as a sequel to Carson's Teen X EP and its Relapsed deluxe edition. In addition, the album and its artwork are named after and pay tribute to the 2012 film Project X. The album was executively produced by producers Star Boy and Outtatown, who produced a majority of the album. Upon release, the album received mixed reviews from critics, who praised the production but found fault with the songwriting and negatively compared Ken to other rappers.

Critical reception

Project X was released to mixed reviews from critics, who praised the production but criticized Ken's songwriting and felt his sound was derivative. Pitchfork reviewer Mano Sundaresan compared the album to label boss Playboi Carti's album Whole Lotta Red, noting that while Carti "[yelped] and [screamed] all over WLR, [Ken] is comparatively chill," and ultimately concluded that "Project X aims for an entirely different tone than Whole Lotta Red; [Ken] and his producers are going for something sweeter, less scorched and serrated, and they achieve it in fits and starts." However, he criticized Ken's writing, saying that "as the album progresses, it becomes obvious when [Ken]’s cartoonish cool shrouds lazy songwriting," and accused him of  "trying to emulate Carti's chaos or Lil Uzi Vert’s velocity," specifically noting the songs "Shake" and "Hella" for being repetitive.

HipHopDX reviewer Vivian Medithi began his review by admitting that he thought Ken was "a good rapper with an ear for melody and access to some of the genre's most exciting new beatmakers" and that "when Project X succeeds, Ken's music feels as kinetic and hedonistic as the movie the album is named after." Medithi, like Sundaresan, also distinguished Ken's rapping style from Playboi Carti's, noting that Ken used a "fast-paced, words-running-together flow", but felt like his favorite beats from the album ripped off those from Carti songs. Specifically, he compared the beats for "Party All Day" and "Who's Next" to "Beno" and "Long Time". He criticized Ken's delivery, claiming that "Ken's biggest weakness as a vocalist is sticking to one tone and register for the entirety of a song," and that on songs that he felt were "designed for the mosh pit," his vocals "leave a lot to be desired; there's no palpable passion behind a quip like, 'I keep me a stick/I keep me a Groot,'" in reference to the song "Clutch". Medithi praised "Change", "Run + Ran", "Shake", and "So What" as standouts, writing that "the album is solid when Ken's raps are fully dialed in."

Track listing

References

2021 debut albums
Mumble rap albums